The White Palace was the main residence of the Sasanian King of Kings in the capital of Ctesiphon (about  southeast of Baghdad), most likely founded by the second Sasanian monarch Shapur I.

In later Islamic-era sources, the White Palace is often confused with the Ayvan-e Kesra. However, early Muslim writers such as al-Tabari and Ya'qubi, who both drew their work from primary sources, differentiate between the two palaces. In reality, the Ayvan-e Kesra was a 6th-century construction located in Aspanbar, a section south of the White Palace. It was an open building, preferred for public audiences, banquets, and welcoming foreign emissaries, in contrast to the White Palace, which was well-fortified and easy to protect.

The White Palace was occupied and pillaged during the Arab conquest of Iran. In 755, the Abbasid caliph al-Mansur started the demolition of the palace in order to build his new capital, Baghdad. While he later ordered the palace to be restored, it remained in decay. It was finally demolished in 903 by the Abbasid caliph al-Muqtafi, who used its remnants to finish the construction of the Taj Palace in Baghdad.

References

Sources 
 
 
 

Buildings and structures completed in the 3rd century
Former palaces
Sasanian palaces
Ctesiphon
Buildings and structures demolished in the 8th century